Gurramguda is located in Ranga Reddy District (Hyderabad), Telangana, India. It is part of Badangpet Municipal Corporation. Gurramguda is 12 kilometers away from Hyderabad, 6 kilometers from LB Nagar and 3 kilometers from Vanastalipuram. It is a rapidly developing locality around Hyderabad.

Transport 
Gurramguda is well connected by roads to all major parts of the Hyderabad, Nagarjuna sagar Highway is just 1 km away, numerous buses of TSRTC frequently service Gurramguda from different Bus depot like Medhani, Jubliee, Dilsukhnagar, Kothi, Ibrahimpatnam etc., linking it with the city and surrounding suburbs.

Neighbouring Areas 
Gurramguda is bordered by Vanastalipuram to the North West, Almasguda to the west, Nadergul to the south, Injapur to north east and Turkayamjal to the south east.

Residential Town 
Gurramguda is mainly residential town. There are many gated communities coming up, few such noted communities are Balaji Homes, Gurram Savithramma colony, Jakkidi's Enclave, Rajyalaxmi Nagar phase 1 and 2, Postal colony, Teachers colony, Brindavan colony, Srilaxmi nagar, SBR colony, Jakkidi Nagar, Panchyatraj colony, sri venkateswara colony,  Sri srinivasapuram colony, Gaddams Enclave, AS Nagar, GBR colony, Aditya nagar phase 1,2,3, Sri saidurga nagar, Saraswati Enclave, Gold Phase colony, Jaisuryapatnam,Sr and Sri Sri Avenue etc. There has been a great development in recent years and a number of colonies have come up, all families living in harmony.

Education 
Gurramguda is home to number of institutes which impart higher education like Sphoorthy Engineering College, Ravi PG College, Sri chaitanya coaching centre along with primary and secondary schools like Bloomingdale School, Mandal Praja Parishad Schools(MPPS), Zee kids for pre primary. apart from these there are Delhi Public School and Sri Vamshidhar High School within 2 to 3 kilometers which follows a CBSE ciriculam and also there is an aircraft training facility on the village outskirts.

Banks
Gurramguda located with  BANK OF BARODA and ATM

Agriculture
Previously this area was with agricultural lands. Now Gurramguda is occupied with multiple residential colonies.

Vegetable Market 
Near pochamma temple vegetables are sold on every Saturday by local people.

Sports 
Gurramguda is developing into sports hub of the surrounding villages as facilities related to different sports like GGR Tennis Academy, Stop and Play game zone, GNR Cricket Ground, Hasten Go-Karting and BJ&Sons Indoor Swimming pool have come up.

Religious Places 
There are many religious places in Gurramguda, some of them are Hanuman Temple, Sivalayam Temple, Saibaba Mandir etc..

Agricultural fields 
In Gurramguda there are paddy fields, milk fields, poultry also can seen.

Parks 
One of the main park in gurram guda is Sanjeevani Vanam.located to the side of nagarjuna sagar high way.

References

Villages in Ranga Reddy district